Ego zebra is a species of goby native to the Arabian Sea off the coast of Oman where it is found at a depth of about  inhabiting open waters near small cracks and holes available for refuge.  This species grows to a length of  SL.  This species is the only known member of its genus.

References

Gobiidae
Fish described in 1994